Roberto Basílico was an Argentine footballer, who played in Atlanta and River Plate. He served as defender in the River team that won the first title of professionalism in 1932.

Biography 
Roberto Basílico was born in Buenos Aires. He began his career in Club Atlético Atlanta. In 1931 Basílico was hired by River team, who began incorporating several reinforcements overlooking the championship. On March 13, 1932, Basilico debuted as defender in a win over Chacarita Juniors 3–1. That same year River Plate played the championship game against Club Atlético Independiente. The match was played at the Gasómetro with a score of 3–0 in favor of River, with goals by Ferreyra, Peucelle, and Zatelli.

References

External links 
lanacion.com.ar - river-tu-grato-nombre  

Argentine footballers
Footballers from Buenos Aires
Club Atlético River Plate footballers
Club Atlético Atlanta footballers
Argentine sportspeople of Italian descent
Association football defenders
Year of birth missing
Río de la Plata